Bystus is a genus of beetles in the family Anamorphidae. There are about six described species in Bystus.

Species
These six species belong to the genus Bystus:
 Bystus apicalis (Gerstaecker, 1858)
 Bystus fibulatus (Gorham, 1890)
 Bystus hemisphaericus (Gerstaecker, 1858)
 Bystus limbatus (Gorham, 1873)
 Bystus seminulum Gorham, 1873
 Bystus ulkei (Crotch, 1873)

References

Further reading

 

Coccinelloidea genera
Articles created by Qbugbot